The overview effect is a cognitive shift reported by some astronauts while viewing the Earth from space. Researchers have characterized the effect as "a state of awe with self-transcendent qualities, precipitated by a particularly striking visual stimulus". The most prominent common aspects of personally experiencing the Earth from space are appreciation and perception of beauty, unexpected and even overwhelming emotion, and an increased sense of connection to other people and the Earth as a whole. The effect can cause changes in the observer’s self concept and value system, and can be transformative.

With recognition of the cost and environmental pollution involved in actual space travel, immersive virtual reality simulations have been designed to try to induce the overview effect in earthbound participants.

Characteristics

Broadly, Yaden et al. (2016) state that the most prominent common aspects of the astronauts' experience were appreciation and perception of beauty, unexpected and even overwhelming emotion, and an increased sense of connection to other people and the Earth as a whole. Yaden et al. proposed that the overview effect can be understood in terms of awe and self-transcendence, which they describe as "among the deepest and most powerful aspects of the human experience". More specifically, they write that the effect might best be understood as "a state of awe with self-transcendent qualities, precipitated by a particularly striking visual stimulus". Yaden posited that the overview effect triggers awe through both perceptual vastness (like seeing the Grand Canyon) and conceptual vastness (like contemplating big ideas like infinity).

Yaden et al. (2016) write that some astronauts viewing Earth from space "report overwhelming emotion and feelings of identification with humankind and the planet as a whole". The effect can cause changes in the observer’s self concept and value system, and is sometimes transformative". Though astronaut Leland Melvin said the effect seems to take hold of astronauts regardless of culture or nation of origin, Yaden et al. observed that cultural differences, including differences in religious and social identity, affect the ways in which the effect is experienced and interpreted. Expressions range from the religious, to the "vaguely spiritual", to the naturalistic, to calls to social duty.

Author Frank White, who in the 1980s coined the term overview effect after interviewing many astronauts, said that the overview effect is "beyond words", requiring experience to understand, even likening it in this regard to Zen Buddhism. He said that astronauts' very first views of the planet were generally very significant, adding that some experience the effect "in a moment" while in others it grows over time; and generally that the effect "does accumulate".

Not all astronauts experience the overview effect. Further, White distinguished experiences in low Earth orbit where the planet takes up most of an astronaut's view, from experiences on the Moon in which one sees the whole Earth "against a backdrop of the entire cosmos". He described a "big difference" between professional astronauts, who are focused on their missions—versus people who have recently been going into space "with an intention to have an experience" and who may already be aware of the overview effect.

Alternative characterizations
Beginning in the 2010s, science historian Jordan Bimm argued against White's interpretation that the overview effect is, in Bimm's words, "a reliably produced mental effect—a naturally occurring phenomenon between the environment and the human mind". Instead, Bimm asserts that the effect is "both a natural and cultural object" that is variable over particular individuals, divergent cultures, and different time periods. Preliminarily, Bimm noted that studies of early test pilots' negative-experience break-off phenomenon ended in 1973 (displaced by White's "positive conversion narrative"), that astronauts in a "lie to fly" culture feel career pressure to avoid reporting negative psychological reactions, and that individuals already aware of the overview effect may make it a self-fulfilling prophecy. He posited that it was Cold War and mastery-of-Earth mentalities of Western technological supremacy that contributed to the rise of borderless-world concepts such as the Gaia hypothesis, spaceship Earth, and the Blue Marble.

Bimm expressed concern over White's perception that the effect embodies a natural imperative for humans to pursue space travel and colonization, Bimm saying the attitude resembles the 18th century American colonialist, expansionist concept of manifest destiny. Bimm warned of hubris underlying a perception of having achieved a new level of enlightenment that he called the "overlord effect".

History

English astronomer Fred Hoyle wrote in 1948 that, "once a photograph of the Earth, taken from the outside, is available, a new idea as powerful as any in history will be let loose". After Apollo 8 astronaut William Anders' December 1968 Earthrise photograph of the Earth from lunar orbit, the Apollo missions were credited with inspiring the environmental movement, the first Earth Day being held in April 1970. Hoyle said that people suddenly seemed to care about protecting Earth's natural environment, though others attribute that awareness to Rachel Carson's 1962 book Silent Spring and reactions to several environmental disasters in the 1960s.

The term overview effect was coined by self-described "space philosopher" Frank White, who said he thought he first had "a mild experience" of the effect while flying across the country and looking out the aircraft's window. That experience led him to imagine living in an O'Neill cylinder (habitat in space), which inspired him to become involved with the Space Studies Institute and begin speaking with astronauts.

White's astronaut interviews confirmed the importance of the difference between intellectual knowledge versus experience, of perceiving the "striking thinness of the atmosphere", of thinking of ourselves interconnected and part of the Earth as an organic system, and that we as different people "are all in this together". The first public use of the term was in a poster in at a Space Studies Institute meeting in 1985. Eventually, White wrote about the effect in his book The Overview Effect — Space Exploration and Human Evolution (1987), which has a fourth edition (2021). White's work did not attain broad influence until the 2010s—a period of increased societal divisions and a new prospect of private space travel.

Accounts

Michael Collins,
Yuri Gagarin,
Ron Garan,
Chris Hadfield,
James Irwin,
Mae Jemison,
Scott Kelly,
André Kuipers,
Jerry Linenger,
Mike Massimino,
Anne McClain,
Leland Melvin,
Edgar Mitchell,
Rusty Schweickart,
William Shatner, and
Nicole Stott
are among those reported to have experienced the effect.

Michael Collins (Apollo 11; 1969) said that "the thing that really surprised me was that it [Earth] projected an air of fragility. And why, I don't know. I don't know to this day. I had a feeling it's tiny, it's shiny, it's beautiful, it's home, and it's fragile.

Edgar Mitchell (Apollo 14; 1971) described it as an "explosion of awareness" and an "overwhelming sense of oneness and connectedness... accompanied by an ecstasy... an epiphany".

William Shatner (Blue Origin NS-18, 2021) said immediately after landing that "everybody in the world needs to do this. ... The covering of blue was... the sheet, this blanket, this comforter of blue that we have around us... And then suddenly you shoot through it... as though you whip off a sheet off you when you’re asleep, and you’re looking into blackness, into black ugliness, and you look down, there’s the blue down there, and the black up there and it’s... Mother Earth and comfort, and there is—is there death? I don’t know".

Lasting impact
Researchers have recognized that awe-based experiences—such as interaction with nature, religious or spiritual or mystical experiences, meditation, and peak and flow experiences during high task performance—can change a person and promote the feeling of unity or interconnectedness. Besides being an enjoyable experience, such phenomena can have short and long-term positive outcomes such as increased well-being, pro-social and pro-environmental attitudes, and improved physical health. The self-transcendent experience can cause long-term changes in personal outlook, and can influence peoples' very sense of self by affecting their self-schema ("the particular framework through which (people) imagine themselves in relation to the world").

Specifically, Frank White noted that upon return, some astronauts became involved in humanitarian activities, or became artists, with astronaut Edgar Mitchell founding the Institute of Noetic Sciences. Though Yaden et al. (2016) noted that the experience can be transformative, White said in 2019 that generally there was no "dramatic transformation" or "marching in peace parades"; that the lasting effect was more subtle.

A 2018 questionnaire survey of 39 astronauts and cosmonauts found that humanistic changes predominated over spiritual changes. In particular, the survey found a moderate degree of change in the Perceptions of Earth subscale (Earth as "a beautiful, fragile object to be treasured"), which significantly correlated with subsequent involvement in environmental causes. In contrast, the survey found "no to very small change" in the Spiritual Change subscale, which the researchers said likely reflected established pre-launch values.

Immediately after his October 2021 Blue Origin flight, William Shatner told founder Jeff Bezos, "what you have given me is the most profound experience. I hope I never recover from this. I hope that I can maintain what I feel now". However, in October 2022 he recounted that it took hours for him to realize why he wept after stepping out of the spacecraft: "I realized I was in grief for the Earth". He later said that "I saw more clearly than I have... (the) slow death of Earth and we on it". His biography Boldly Go recounted that "it was among the strongest feelings of grief I have ever encountered. The contrast between the vicious coldness of space and the warm nurturing of Earth below filled me with overwhelming sadness. Every day, we are confronted with the knowledge of further destruction of Earth at our hands... It filled me with dread. My trip to space was supposed to be a celebration; instead, it felt like a funeral."

At one point the Skylab 4 (1970s) crew refused to work, asserting, in the flight director’s words, "their needs to reflect, to observe, to find their place amid these baffling, fascinating, unprecedented experiences". This event, plus research indicating that actively photographing the Earth has positive psychological effects, caused Yaden et al. to posit that studying the overview effect might improve understanding of psychological well-being in isolated, confined, extreme (ICE) environments such as space flight.

Early photos of Earth taken from space have inspired a mild version of the overview effect in earthbound viewers. The images became prominent symbols of environmental concern and have been credited for raising the public's consciousness about the fragility of Earth and expanding concern for long-term survival on a finite planet.

The accumulating experience of astronauts and space tourists inspires in many of them a strong desire to protect the Earth by actively communicating their broadened perspective, for example by speaking at international climate summits. Virgin Galactic officials specifically cite the overview effect as a motivation for carrying people to the edge of space, to fundamentally change the way people think about their home world. Critics note, however, that the space travel needed to personally experience the full overview effect, itself involves significant environmental pollution. A less polluting approach is to simulate the effect on Earth, with virtual reality technology.

Simulating the effect
Researchers have found that virtual reality (VR) technology elicits components of awe-based experiences and can induce minor cognitive shifts in participants' world views similar to those of the overview effect. Perceived safety, personal background and familiarity with the environment, and induction of a small visceral fear reaction, were found to be key contributors to the immersive experience. VR studies through 2019 had not observed a transformative experience on a scale similar to the overview effect itself, but VR experience can trigger profound emotional responses such as awe.

A 2019 study found that a virtual experience invoked "minor transformative experiences in some participants", including appreciation of beauty and vastness, realization of interconnectedness, and a potential intent to change one’s behavior. Recognizing the relatively early state of VR technology, the researchers urged using knowledge of profound transformative experiences to motivate the design of VR installations, and thereafter study the VR experience itself as its own phenomenon.

On December 24, 2018—the fiftieth anniversary of the first day on which humans saw an earthrise with their own eyes—the Spacebuzz project was unveiled in Hilversum, Netherlands.

Researchers at the University of Missouri tried to reproduce the experience with a water-filled flotation tank, half a tonne of Epsom salts, and a waterproof VR headset.

"The Infinite" provides an hour-long simulation of being on the International Space Station using 360-degree, 3D, astronaut-recorded footage from the VR film Space Explorers: The ISS Experience. Visitors share a 12,500 square foot (1150 square meter) area allowing them to physically explore the ISS and look outside.

A three-dimensional model of the Earth  in diameter, created from detailed NASA imagery and appearing to float in the air, toured the U.K. in 2022, the installation "aim(ing) to create a sense of the Overview Effect".

Other names
The overview effect has been referred to as the big picture effect (Edgar Mitchell), orbital perspective (Ronald J. Garan Jr.), and the astronaut's secret (Albert Sacco).

Referring to how profound Mitchell's experience on the moon was—distinguished from experiences in low earth orbit—author Frank White called Mitchell's experience universal insight as it had a more universal perspective.

Related effects
A 1957 article in The Journal of Aviation Medicine studied the break-off phenomenon, which it defined as "a feeling of physical separation from the earth when piloting an aircraft at high altitude". Main precipitating factors were concluded to be: flying alone, at high altitude, with relatively little to do. Researchers summarized pilots' descriptions as "a feeling of being isolated, detached, or separated physically from the earth" or as a perception of "somehow losing their connection with the world". Individual reactions ranged from exhilaration or feeling nearer to God, to anxiety, fear, or loneliness. Scientific literature covering the break-off phenomenon ended in 1973.

Anthropologist Deana L. Weibel introduced the term ultraview effect as a response to an unobscured view of stars, an effect that she concluded was experienced more rarely than the overview effect. Contrasted from the overview effect's sense of connection, the ultraview effect responds to the limitations of our knowledge, causing "a transformative sense of incomprehension and a feeling of shrinking or self-diminution".

Frank White posited the term Copernicus Perspective—awareness of being part of the Solar System when one is on another planet.

Science historian Jordan Bimm described how the concept shares similarities with the British concept of the sublime—an experience associated with views from high mountains.

Notes

See also 

 Collective consciousness
 Earth in culture
 Earth phase
 Effect of spaceflight on the human body
 Extraterrestrial sky
 Pale Blue Dot
 Scale (analytical tool)
 Space For Humanity
 Spaceship Earth

References

External links 
Overview Institute
Overview, short film from Planetary Collective
Speech on The Overview Effect and its Importance in Civilization, 5 minute talk by JP Chastain at Ignite Boise (2012)

Articles containing video clips
Concepts in ethics
Concepts in philosophical anthropology
Concepts in the philosophy of mind
Psychological concepts
Spaceflight concepts
Spirituality